Johannesburg City Parks is a Not-for-Gain company established under Section 21 of the South African Companies Act and wholly owned by the City of Johannesburg.

It is tasked with the maintenance of burial grounds, parks, green areas and trees around Johannesburg.

Major Johannesburg Parks 
 Johannesburg Botanical Garden, Emmarentia
 Delta Park, Blairgowrie
 Huddle Park, Linksfield
 The Wilds Municipal Nature Reserve, Houghton
 Golden Harvest, Northwold
 Alberts Farm, Albertskroon
 Walter Sisulu Botanical Garden, Roodepoort
 Rietfontein Nature Reserve, Paulshof
 Melville Koppies Nature Reserve, Melville
 Kloofendal Nature Reserve, Roodepoort
 Pioneer Park/Wemmer Pan, Rosettenville
 Thokoza Park, Soweto

See also 
 Johannesburg
 Protected areas of South Africa

References

External links 
 Johannesburg City Parks